Ovidiu Ioan Perianu (born 16 April 2002) is a Romanian footballer who plays as a defensive midfielder for Liga I club Chindia Târgoviște, on loan from FCSB.

Club career
A product of FCSB's youth academy, Perianu made his debut for the club as a substitute against Alashkert in the UEFA Europa League on 25 July 2019. On 11 August 2019, Perianu made his Liga I debut for FCSB in a 3–1 loss against Voluntari.

International career
Perianu has represented Romania at under-17 level. On 13 August 2019, Perianu made his debut for Romania U18 against Albania.

Career statistics

Club
Statistics accurate as of match played 13 March 2023.

Honours

Club
FCSB
 Cupa României: 2019–20
Supercupa României runner-up: 2020

References

2002 births
Living people
Sportspeople from Bârlad
Romanian footballers
Association football midfielders
Liga I players
FC Steaua București players
FC Botoșani players
AFC Chindia Târgoviște players
Romania youth international footballers
Romania under-21 international footballers